Great Episodes is a series of historical novels written by Ann Rinaldi. They combine fictional and non-fictional characters to describe events in history.

Series
A Ride into Morning (1991), 
A Break with Charity (1992), 
The Fifth of March (1993), 
Finishing Becca (1994), 
The Secret of Sarah Revere (1995), 
Keep Smiling Through (1996), 
Hang a Thousand Trees with Ribbons (1996), 
An Acquaintance with Darkness (1997), 
Cast Two Shadows (1998), 
The Coffin Quilt (1999), 
The Staircase (2000), 
Or Give Me Death (2003), 
An Unlikely Friendship (2007), 
Come Juneteenth (2007), 
The Ever-After Bird (2007), 
Juliet's Moon (2008), 
The Letter Writer (2008)

External links 
 Ann Rinaldi Official Website

Historical novels by series